Caleb McSurdy (born February 24, 1990) is a former professional American football linebacker in the National Football League for the Dallas Cowboys and St. Louis Rams. He played college football at the University of Montana.

Early years
Born and raised in Boise, Idaho, McSurdy attended Borah High School, where he practiced football and track. He received All-conference honors three straight times and was a team captain in football as a junior and senior. 

In his last year, he was an All-state linebacker and tight end, recording 65 tackles, 22 receptions for 232 yards and 4 touchdowns.

College career
McSurdy accepted a football scholarship from the University of Montana in Missoula. As a true freshman, he registered 18 tackles and one forced fumble in 16 games.

As a sophomore, he collected 32 tackles in 15 games. He also finished fourth in the 2010 Big Sky Conference track and field meet, with a discus throw of 161’, 2 1/4”.

As a junior, McSurdy became a starter at middle linebacker, leading the team with 112 tackles, while making 7 tackles for loss (forth on the team). Against Montana State University, he tallied a career-high 17 tackles. Against Weber State University, he had 16 tackles. He also received All-League Academic honors for the third consecutive year.

As a senior, he finished with 130 tackles (led the team), 7.5 tackles for loss, 4 sacks (second on the team) and 2 interceptions, including one returned for a 61-yards touchdown. Against California Polytechnic State University he had 17 tackles. Against Western Oregon University, he had 14 tackles, 2 quarterback hurries and one forced fumble.

Professional career

Dallas Cowboys
McSurdy was selected in the seventh round (222nd overall) of the 2012 NFL Draft by the Dallas Cowboys. He was drafted with the intention of playing him at inside linebacker in the Cowboys' 3-4 defense and also at fullback. He suffered an Achilles injury in training camp and was placed on the injured reserve list on August 26, 2012.

The next year the defense changed to a 4-3 scheme, with him competing for the backup position at middle linebacker. He was released on August 31, 2013.

St. Louis Rams
The St. Louis Rams signed him to their practice squad on December 10, 2013. He was waived on July 21, 2014.

Cleveland Browns
The Cleveland Browns signed him on August 13, 2014. He was released on August 24.

References

External links
 Montana bio

1990 births
Living people
Sportspeople from Boise, Idaho
Players of American football from Idaho
American football linebackers
Montana Grizzlies football players
Dallas Cowboys players
St. Louis Rams players